The OTI Festival 1978 was the seventh edition of the annual OTI Festival. It was held in Santiago, Chile, who offered to stage the event after Nicaragua, who won the 1977 contest, was unable to organize it due the outbreak of the Nicaraguan Revolution. Organised by the Organización de Televisión Iberoamericana (OTI) and host broadcasters Televisión Nacional de Chile, Canal 13, UCV Televisión and Canal 9, the contest was held at the Municipal Theatre of Santiago on Saturday 2 December 1978 and was hosted by Raquel Argandoña and Raúl Matas. Matas had previously presented the inaugural OTI Festival back in 1972 in Madrid.

In this year's edition, in which many changes took place, the winner of the show was the Brazilian entrant Denise de Kalafe with her song "El amor... cosa tan rara" (Love... such a strange thing).

Background 
According to the original rules of the OTI Festival, the winning country of the previous year would organise the contest of the following year. In this case, Nicaragua was the winning country of the previous edition of the Latin American contest with the performer Eduardo Gozalez with the song "Quincho Barrilete" (Quincho, the boy of the little barrel), Composed by the renowned Carlos Mejía Godoy. As a result of that victory, Televicentro Canal 2, the Nicaraguan participating broadcaster was going to be the host network and Managua the host city according to an internal committee inside the company. Even the venue for this edition was selected, in this case, the Ruben Darío National Theatre was going to be the venue, however, that year in 1978, started the Nicaraguan Revolution which was boosted by the Sandino Guerrilla in order to topple the dictatorship of Anastasio Somoza Debayle. The outcome of the revolution was a bloody and violent civil war which caused a human and economical catastrophe in the country.

Due to this situation of instability in Nicaragua the Iberoamerican Television Organisation decided to change temporarily the hosting rules of the contest in order to find an alternative host city. Finally Santiago, the Chilean national capital city, among many others, offered itself in order to host the contest. The organisation agreed to locate the festival in that city and finally the Municipal Theatre of Santiago was announced as the venue.

Four Chilean national TV networks joined forces in order to host the OTI Festival. Amongst them, TVN, the National Chilean broadcaster was one of the main organisers of the event together with Canal 13, Canal 9 (Now Chilevisión) and UCV Television, this one is the TV channel of the Catholic University of Valparaiso. With the organisation of these four channels the airing of this edition of the OTI Festival was the first programme on the Chilean television broadcast entirely in color.

Venue 

The initial venue of this seventh edition of the OTI Festival was going to be the Ruben Darío National Theatre of Managua, the Nicaraguan capital city. With 1,199 seats, this theatre was the biggest and the most modern auditorium in the whole of Nicaragua, where many cultural events were held. The construction of that theatre started in 1964 and finished in 1979 in order to give the city a modern auditorium. This theatre used to be a building that was used by the political elite of the country. Although the Nicaraguan revolutionaries tried to make the theatre a building opened to the masses that was not enough to keep the seventh edition of the festival in the city.

Soon after the Chilean participating broadcasters convinced the Iberoamerican Television Organisation members to host the OTI Festival in their capital city, the Municipal Theatre of Santiago, located in the national capital was selected as the venue in a committee held between the top members of the four broadcasters that joined forces in order to host the festival.

The Municipal Theatre of Santiago is an iconic cultural building in the central part of Santiago. Its construction began in the middle of the 19th century under the presidency of Manuel Montt in 1853 and finished four years later in 1857. Since then, this theatre was reconstructed several times due to the frequent fires that destroyed it during a significant part of its history. The building was constructed in French Neoclassical style and its entrance has been conserved despite the frequent fires, reforms and reconstructions. The theatre can seat more than 1,500, which makes it one of the most important theatres in Chile and much bigger than the initially selected venue in Managua.

This theatre is home of the Philharmonic Orchestra of Santiago, the Cultural Corporation of Santiago, the Ballet of Santiago and the Municipal Chorus of Santiago.

Participating countries 
The number of participating countries was smaller in comparison with the previous edition in the festival in Madrid, where 21 countries participated. In total, 19 participating broadcasters from 19 countries sent their delegations and performers to the Chilean capital city. Both state financed and private broadcasting networks that were active members of the Iberoamerican Television Organisation participated in this edition of the festival, amongst them, the four Chilean channels that organised the event.

As usual some of the participating countries such as Mexico, Guatemala and Chile, the host country, selected their participating entrants through live-broadcast national finals in order to select their participants. Other broadcasters with a similar or lower level of resources, decided to select their entrant and song internally.

It must be taken into account the debut of Paraguay in the contest being the veteran Rolando Percy the country's first contestant in the festival. Paraguay was the very last South American country to debut in the event.

Three countries decided to withdraw from the festival. It was not the first time that some countries decided to withdraw, but the broadcasters always justified their decision because of economical problems or disappointing placings. In this edition, for first time, the withdrawing countries alleged political reasons to take that decision. One of those was Portugal. The broadcaster from that country decided to be absent from the event as a protest to the military regime of Augusto Pinochet.

Other countries such as Bolivia, whose broadcaster was preparing its return to the event, decided to rule out their participation because the new military government that emerged from the coup d'état that led to the overthrow of the president Hugo Banzer decided to break all diplomatic relationships with the neighbouring Chile.

Nicaragua, the previous year's winner, was forced to withdraw from the contest for two years because of the catastrophic situation that the Nicaraguan Revolution created, which soon degenerated into a civil war which destroyed the country. It was the first and only time that the winning country of the previous year would not participate in the next edition.

Bitterly disappointed by the previous year's disaster, the participating broadcaster of Guatemala decided to withdraw from the event.

Participating performers 

One of the most controversial performers during this year's edition was the strambotical Chilean entrant Raúl Alarcón, better known as Florcita Motuda, known for his satirical songs and strange external appearance. The title of his entry was "Pobrecito mortal, si quieres ver menos televisión descubrirás que aburrido estarás por la tarde" (Poor average guy, if you want to watch less television you will discover how bored you will be in the afternoon) this makes this song the OTI entry with the longest title ever. His victory was highly controversial because he won with the support of the jurors against the preferences of the audience who supported other songs, including "La tregua" (The truce) performed by Oscar Andrade who got eliminated in the previous rounds of qualification.

Another interesting fact is the participation of the Mexican superstar Lupita D'Alessio who won the massively popular Mexican National OTI Contest, which was the Mexican national final for the main OTI Festival that Televisa used to produce every year. After the disaster that José María Napoleón suffered after his selection that led to his last place with zero points one year before, this time the Mexican entry was acclaimed from the Lupita D'Alessio's victory in the NF.

The Spanish entrant, the singer-songwriter José María Purón (Also known as Chema Purón) with his song "Mi sitio" (My place) was also well received by the audience and the juries of the festival.

The Puerto Rican performer Rafael José who represented his country with his song "Háblame" (Talk to me) was also one of the most notable contributions to this edition of the festival. He was already a well known name in the Puerto Rican musical industry and he would return to the festival in 1980 turning into the winner of the event.

The Brazilian entrant, Denise de Kalafe was also well known in Brazil due to her participation in many music festivals. She represented successfully her home country with her song "Cançao latina" (Latin song) in the Festival Mundial de la Canción Latina (The antecessor of the OTI Festival), which was held in México in 1969. Seven years later in the fourth edition of the OTI Festival held in Acapulco she represented again her country with the song "María de las flores" (Mary of the flowers) which was controversial because it was translated into Spanish to attract the votes from the rest of the Latin American countries. Denise de Kalafe, who was again selected by Rede Globo in order to represent her country after the last year's disaster with Lolita Rodrígues decided to translate again her entry "El amor... cosa tan rara" (Love... such a strange thing) into Spanish. This decision was also motivated because of the absence of Portugal, which was along with Brazil, the only non-Spanish speaking country in the event.

The Salvadorean performer Álvaro Torres, known for his ballads and bolero genere songs was also worth of note. Despite the cold reception that his competing song entitled "Gracias" (Thank you) got, the became a recognised singer in Latin America.

The Colombian representative Billy Pontoni with his song "Joven" (Young) also got an icy welcome in the festival, but this shortcoming would not undermine his strong career in his country.

As an interesting fact, as happened two years before in Acapulco, all the competing songs were performed in Spanish.

Presenters 

The well known Chilean presenter and former Miss Universe Chile 1975 contestant Raquel Argandoña was announced as this year's presenter.

She co-presented the festival with Raúl Matas, a famous Chilean news journalist who had already presented the festival in Madrid in the inaugural OTI Festival back in 1972.

As the presenters used to do every year, after the opening act they made a brief introduction of the show highlighting the goals of the OTI as a media organisation and those of the OTI Festival as a showcase of talented performers in Latin America.

When the performance round started, both presenters made a brief individual introduction of the participating singers, quoting the name of the entrants, the lyricist and the director of the Orchestra.

When the performance round ended, the presenters started contacting the jurors of every participating country from the theatre, including the jurors from the host country who were located in the TVN studios. Both presenters also announced the three most voted contestants when the voting was over.

Running order 
As happened from the inaugural edition and in the following ones, the host broadcaster, in this TVN, Canal 13, Canal 9 and UCV Television in collaboration with the Iberoamerican Television Organisation (OTI) organised a draw in Santiago few days before the event took place.

The Puerto Rican performer Rafael José was the one to open the performance round with his song "háblame" (Talk to me) which was warmly welcomed by the jurors and by the audience.

The Spanish performer José María Purón with his song "Mi sitio" (My place) was the fourth one to enter the stage of the Santiago Municipal theatre.

The prominent salvadoran performer Álvaro Torres was the tenth act to enter the stage of the venue.

Denise de Kalafe, the Brazilian entrant, who would gather much of the attention among the contestants during the night, would be the eleventh entrant to take the stage with her song "El amor, cosa tan rara" (Love... such a strange thing), which was critically acclaimed but at the same time criticised because of its simple staging.

Lupita D'Alessio who was the absolute favourite since her triumph in the national final, with her song "Como tú" (Just like you) was the thirteenth one to enter the stage with more than a pleasant welcome by both the audience and the juries.

The performance round was ended by the entrant from Panama Roger Bares with his song "Te cantaré, yo te amaré"

Voting system 
The voting system followed the same process of the previous years in which the national juries were contacted telephonically by the presenters. Unlike in the previous edition, and to avoid the frequent final ties between the contestants, the participating broadcasters agreed to increase the number of national jurors per country from three to seven. The jurors elected, each one, only their favourite song among the participating entries.

The national juries of every participating country were contacted directly by telephone by the presenters from the Municipal theatre of Santiago in order to know the decision of the jurors. The jury members of Chile, the host country, were located in the same Municipal Theatre.

Voting system 
As the number of national juries increased, also did the number of points awarded to the participating countries. Thanks to this change, the number of points that every country could accumulate was much bigger in contrast with the previous editions. The contestants that ended in the first and second positions were separated only by five points of difference. Finally three countries occupied the podium, Brazil, The United States and México.

Result 
The winner of the show was the Brazilian entrant Denise de Kalafe with "El amor...Cosa tan rara" (Love... such a strange thing), a song that reached a record of points awarded by an OTI contestant. This song marked the second victory of Brazil in the history of the festival and also turned Brazil, alongside Mexico, in the second country to get a victory in the contest.

Univision, the biggest Spanish speaking channel of the United States repeated its previous year's success with the performer "Susy Leman" with the song "Ha vuelto ya" (He has already returned) who got the second place.

The third place was awarded to Lupita D'Alessio, who was considered by the press, the sentimental winner of the show with her song "Como tú" (Just like you)

Two countries ended in the last place with zero points, the debuting Paraguay with the song "Cantando" (Singing) by Rolando Percy and Ecuador with Gracián and his song "Juan el infeliz" (Juan, the unhappy man).

Voting by country

Impact 
The audience figures just as happened in the previous year, reached the level of 300 million viewers. The show was acclaimed due to the successful debut of the four participating Chilean broadcasters in the color broadcasting. The quality of the sound system and the stage were also highly valued by the media.

Denise de Kalafe saw her already solid career boosted, not only in Brazil, but also in Mexico, where she found a fervorous fanbase. Her success in that country led her to move to Mexico. She holds the dual Mexican-Brazilian citizenship.

The Mexican entrant, Lupita D'Alessio was arguably the most acclaimed performer and the most remembered one after the festival. In fact, she turned into one of the most recognised female vocalist in all Latin America. Her third place in the contest launched her career in all the Spanish speaking world to the point that she has released more than 20 studio albums and hit songs. Her success in the festival also boosted her acting career in famous Telenovelas during the 1970s and 1980s decades. She also took part in one film during her career.

The Spanish singer-songwriter José María Purón also saw his career expanded. As a singer, he released five albums after his participation in the OTI Festival. During his career he composed many song for both Spanish and Latin American singers such as the Venezuelan José Luis Rodríguez. He also composed songs for many Spanish contestants in both the OTI Festival and in the Eurovision Song Contest, such as Serafín Zubiri Anabel Conde (He composed Vuelve conmigo, which got the second place in Eurovision in 1995).

Other contestants such as the Salvadoran Álvaro Torres and the Colombian Billy Pontoni saw their careers boosted.

See also 
 OTI Festival 1972
 OTI Festival 1977
 Eurovision Song Contest 1978
 Eurovision Song Contest 1995

References

External links 
 OTI Festival 1978

OTI Festival by year
Music festivals in Chile
1978 in Chile
1978 in Latin music
Canal 13 (Chilean TV channel) original programming
TV+ (Chile)
Chilevisión original programming